International Society of Radiographers and Radiological Technologists (ISRRT) is a non-governmental organization formed in 1959 which aims to give direction to the Radiological profession as a whole through collaboration with national representative bodies.
ISRRT is working with the World Health Organization. It represents more than 65 member countries and 200,000 radiographers as members.

History
In July 1959 at the 9th International Congress of Radiology, an organization was formed as International Secretariat of Radiographers and Radiological Technicians in Munich, Germany. Its name was then changed to International Society of Radiographers and Radiological Technicians in August 1962. Later, in 1992, the name was changed to International Society of Radiographers and Radiological Technologists.

Daughter organizations
Malaysian Society Of Radiographers.

See also
National Council on Radiation Protection and Measurements
Society for Radiological Protection

References

External links
 

Radiology organizations